Russell is an unincorporated community and census-designated place in Barrow County, Georgia, United States. The population was 1,203 at the 2010 census.

History
The community most likely was named after Richard Russell Sr. (1861–1938), chief justice of the Georgia Supreme Court.

The Georgia General Assembly incorporated Russell in 1902. The city's municipal charter was repealed in 1995.

Geography
It is bordered to the north and west by the city of Winder, the Barrow County seat.

Demographics

References

Census-designated places in Georgia (U.S. state)
Census-designated places in Barrow County, Georgia
Unincorporated communities in Georgia (U.S. state)
Former municipalities in Georgia (U.S. state)
Populated places disestablished in 1995